Shamoo may refer to:
Adil Shamoo (born 1941), Assyrian-American biochemist
Shammu (born 1992), Indian actress
Shamu, one of the first orcas (killer whales) captured and displayed for the public
Shamu (SeaWorld show), a series of orca shows produced at SeaWorld parks

See also
Shamus (disambiguation)